A straw owner is a person who owns property legally or has the legal appearance of owning something but does so on behalf of another, sometimes for a fee, and typically solely to hide the identity of the effective owner.  Most instances of straw ownership are legal, but the arrangement is sometimes made for nefarious, illegal purposes.

In the realm of real estate, a "straw owner" would be the person who holds title to the property, and for all legal purposes and outwardly the owner, but who acts on behalf of a hidden person who installed them as the legal owner.  Though the practice itself is legal, widespread, and sometimes beneficial to the parties involved, it is sometimes used to hide assets from the courts and creditors or used to purchase real estate for money laundering or to hide illegal gains.

See also 
 Straw man (law)
 Straw deed
 Straw purchase
 Offshoring
 Tax evasion
 Money laundering
 Dummy corporation

Real estate terminology